Podkarpackie Centrum Piłki Nożnej, shortly PCPN, also known as Stadion Miejski w Stalowej Woli and Stadion Stali Stalowa Wola, is a football stadium in Stalowa Wola, Poland. It opened in 2020 and has been the home stadium of Stal Stalowa Wola since its completion. The stadium has lighting and a heated pitch. It holds 3,764 people (including 258 seats for visitors fans).

The stadium is currently owned by the City of Stalowa Wola.

History

The previous stadium that was located in this place was called "Stadion Miejskiego Ośrodka Sportu i Rekreacji". It was one of the first buildings in Stalowa Wola built in the late 1930s, with a maximum capacity of 12,000.

Works related to the construction of the new stadium started in June 2011, with demolition of the stand on the side of the Hutnicza Street. Currently there is the roofed stand with a capacity of 1,430 seats in its place. In 2016 (that is considered to be the Podkarpackie Centrum Piłki Nożnej construction start year), demolition and construction of the west stand works started. The planned capacity of the stadium was to be 10,000 places. Ultimately it has 3,764. 

Podkarpackie Centrum Piłki Nożnej opened in 2020. In the first match at the new stadium, on February 29, 2020, Stal drew 0–0 with Bytovia Bytów (it was also the inauguration of artificial lighting). During the 2020–21 season Stal Stalowa Wola was supposed to share the stadium with the I liga side Resovia, because their home stadium in Rzeszów was being renovated then. On October 23, 2020, the latter team decided to play at the Rzeszów City Stadium.

On 8 February 2021, it was announced that PCPN will host home games of II liga club Stal Rzeszów, due to the renovation of the Rzeszów City Stadium. They would play here games against Pogoń Siedlce (1–5), Znicz Pruszków (1–0), Błękitni Stargard (2–2), Garbarnia Kraków and KKS 1925 Kalisz.

On 27 February 2021, the PCPK training pitch hosted the III liga game – Wólczanka Wólka Pełkińska (serving as a host) were defeated 0–1 by Wisła Puławy. On 7 March 2021, the III liga Sokół Sieniawa game against Wólczanka was also played on the training pitch.

In April 2021, the stadium hosted the regional Polish Cup final – Stal Stalowa Wola 0–0 (p. 6–5) Siarka Tarnobrzeg game.

National team tournaments
In March and April 2020, the UEFA Development Tournament matches were to take place at the stadium. The participants were to be Poland U-16, Venezuela U-16, Iceland U-16 and Iran U-16. On 18 March 2020, the tournament was canceled due to the COVID-19 pandemic and the epidemiological threat in Poland.

Notable games

First home game; first II liga game; highest attendance

Highest scoring

Tenants
 regular:  Stal Stalowa Wola,  Stal Stalowa Wola II
 interim:  Sokół Sieniawa (one game in 2021),  Stal Rzeszów (games in 2021),  Wólczanka Wólka Pełkińska (one game in 2021)

Notes

References

External links
  Stal Stalowa Wola Stadium at the official website of Stal
  Stal Stalowa Wola Stadium at stadiony.net

Football venues in Poland
Stal Stalowa Wola
Sports venues in Podkarpackie Voivodeship